The conception of a maternal impression rests on the belief that a powerful mental (or sometimes physical) influence working on the mother's mind may produce an impression, either general or definite, on the child she is carrying.  The child might be said to be "marked" as a result.

Medicine
Maternal impression, according to a long-discredited medical theory, was a phenomenon that explained the existence of birth defects and congenital disorders. The theory stated that an emotional stimulus experienced by a pregnant woman could influence the development of the fetus. For example, it was sometimes supposed that the mother of the Elephant Man was frightened by an elephant during her pregnancy, thus "imprinting" the memory of the elephant onto the gestating fetus. Mental problems, such as schizophrenia and depression, were believed to be a manifestation of similar disordered feelings in the mother. For instance, a pregnant woman who experienced great sadness might imprint depressive tendencies onto the fetus in her womb.

The theory of maternal impression was largely abandoned by the 20th century, with the development of modern genetic theory.

Folklore
In folklore, maternal imprinting, or Versehen (a German noun meaning "inadvertance" or as a verb "to provide") as it is usually called, is the belief that a sudden fear of some object or animal in a pregnant woman can cause her child to bear the mark of it.

Oswald Spengler understood maternal imprinting to be a folkloric understanding of what he called "blood feeling" or the formation of a group aesthetic of a bodily ideal:
What is called the Versehen of a pregnant woman is only a particular and not very important instance of the workings of a very deep and powerful formative principle inherent in all that is of the race side. It is a matter of common observation that elderly married people become strangely like one another, although probably Science with its measuring instruments would "prove" the exact opposite. It is impossible to exaggerate the formative power of this living pulse, this strong inward feeling for the perfection of one's own type. The feeling for race-beauty—so opposite to the conscious taste of ripe urbans for intellectual-individual traits of beauty—is immensely strong in primitive men, and for that very reason never emerges into their consciousness. But such a feeling is race-forming. It undoubtedly molded the warrior- and hero-type of a nomad tribe more and definitely on one bodily ideal, so that it would have been quite unambiguous to speak of the race-figure of Romans or Ostrogoths.

Pliny the Elder also comments at length about the phenomenon of postpartum maternal impression in bears, i.e., the folk belief that newborn bears must be licked and molded into bear-shape by their mothers.

See also
 Lihi
 Cortisol#Effects during pregnancy
 Epigenetics
 Fetal origins hypothesis
 Fetal origins of adult disease
 Lamarckism
 Mary Toft
 Mooncalf
 Pseudoscience
 Sooterkin

References

Bibliography
 Wendy Doniger and Gregory Spinner. "Misconceptions: Parental Imprinting" in "Science in Culture" edited by Peter Louis Galison, Stephen Richards Graubard, Everett Mendelsohn, Transaction Publishers, 2001
 Lily Weiser-Aall. "Svangerskap og Fodsel i Nyere Norsk Tradisjon" in Folklore, Vol. 82, No. 4 (Winter, 1971), pp. 339–40
 Patricia R. Stokes. "Pathology, Danger, and Power: Women's and Physicians' Views of Pregnancy and Childbirth in Weimar Germany" in Social History of Medicine 2000 Vol. 13 (#3)
 Katharine Park. “Impressed Images: Reproducing Wonders,” in Caroline A. Jones and Peter Galison, eds., Picturing Science, Producing Art, New York: Routledge, 1998, 254–71.
 Hiro Hirai. "Imagination, Maternal Desire and Embryology in Thomas Fienus," in G. Manning and C. Klestinec, eds., Professors, Physicians and Practices in the History of Medicine, Cham: Springer, 2017, 211–225.

Obsolete medical theories
Obsolete biology theories
Superstitions
Folklore